Dragomir "Dragan" Racić (Serbian Cyrillic: Драгомир Драган Рацић; 5 April 1945 – 17 July 2019) was a football goalkeeper.

References

1945 births
2019 deaths
Footballers from Belgrade
Red Star Belgrade footballers
CD Castellón footballers
Yugoslav First League players
Association football goalkeepers
Yugoslav footballers
Yugoslav expatriate footballers
Expatriate footballers in Spain